Mitchell Hannan (born 9 March 1994) is a professional Australian rules footballer playing for the Western Bulldogs in the Australian Football League (AFL), having been initially drafted to the Melbourne Football Club. After failing to play in the TAC Cup as a junior, he joined the St Bernard's Football Club in the Victorian Amateur Football Association (VAFA) where he won a premiership and the best on ground in the 2015 VAFA Grand Final. His performances in the VAFA and VFL saw him recruited by the Melbourne Football Club in the 2016 AFL draft and he made his debut in the opening round of the 2017 season.

Pre-AFL career
Originally from Gisborne, Victoria, Hannan failed to make the Calder Cannons and Bendigo Pioneers sides in the TAC Cup before leaving his junior club, Woodend, to join the St Bernard's Football Club in the premier division of the Victorian Amateur Football Association (VAFA). He won a premiership with the club in 2015 and was named the best player on the ground in the grand final, winning the Jock Nelson Medal.

Playing fourteen matches for the season, his performances in the final month led to Footscray coach, Ashley Hansen, declaring he had the potential to be drafted to the AFL. He was pivotal in Footscray's semi final win against  according to Maribyrnong Leader reporter, Tim Michell, where he kicked three goals in the final quarter and "came to life in the last term to inspire his side".

AFL career
Hannan was recruited by the Melbourne Football Club with their first selection and forty-sixth overall in the 2016 national draft. A shoulder injury halted his pre-season and he was considered unlikely to make his debut early in the season. He did not feature in any matches during the JLT Community Series and despite this, he made his debut in the opening round of the 2017 season in the thirty point win against  at Etihad Stadium, in which he kicked two goals. He played the opening four matches before he was omitted for the round five match against  at the Melbourne Cricket Ground, and missed just the one match, returning for the thirty-eight point win against  at Etihad Stadium. 

He played every match until the round twenty game against  at UNSW Canberra Oval, before returning for the last three matches of the year to finish with twenty games in total in his debut season. At the end of the season, he was the Melbourne nominee for the AFL Players Association (AFLPA) best first year player award and finished fourteenth in Melbourne's best and fairest with 216 votes.

He made his debut for the Bulldogs in the Round 7 match against .
He made the grand final in his first year, but was beaten by his old team, Melbourne by 74 points.

Statistics
 Statistics are correct to the end of round 9, 2021

|- style="background-color: #EAEAEA"
! scope="row" style="text-align:center" | 2017
|
| 19 || 20 || 22 || 10 || 138 || 110 || 248 || 49 || 60 || 1.1 || 0.5 || 6.9 || 5.5 || 12.4 || 2.5 || 3.0
|-
! scope="row" style="text-align:center" | 2018
|
| 19 || 15 || 22 || 16 || 112 || 61 || 173 || 50 || 33 || 1.5 || 1.1 || 7.5 || 4.1 || 11.5 || 3.3 || 2.2
|- style="background-color: #EAEAEA"
! scope="row" style="text-align:center" | 2019
|
| 19 || 6 || 4 || 1 || 32 || 29 || 61 || 18 || 8 || 0.7 || 0.2 || 5.3 || 4.8 || 10.2 || 3.0 || 1.3
|-
! scope="row" style="text-align:center" | 2020
|
| 19 || 9 || 7 || 3 || 41 || 31 || 72 || 21 || 15 || 0.8 || 0.3 || 4.6 || 3.4 || 8.0 || 2.3 || 1.7
|- style="background-color: #EAEAEA"
! scope="row" style="text-align:center" | 2021
|
| 29 || 3 || 1 || 2 || 15 || 7 || 22 || 10 || 6 || 0.3 || 0.7 || 5.0 || 2.3 || 7.3 || 3.3 || 2.0
|- class="sortbottom"
! colspan=3| Career
! 53
! 56
! 32
! 338
! 238
! 576
! 148
! 122
! 1.1
! 0.6
! 6.4
! 4.5
! 10.9
! 2.8
! 2.3
|}

Notes

References

External links

1994 births
Living people
Melbourne Football Club players
Australian rules footballers from Victoria (Australia)
Casey Demons players
Western Bulldogs players